Gap junction gamma-2 (GJC2), also known as connexin-46.6 (Cx46.6) and connexin-47 (Cx47) and gap junction alpha-12 (GJA12), is a protein that in humans is encoded by the GJC2 gene.

Function 

This gene encodes a gap junction protein. Gap junction proteins are members of a large family of homologous connexins and comprise 4 transmembrane, 2 extracellular, and 3 cytoplasmic domains. This gene plays a key role in central myelination and is involved in peripheral myelination in humans.

Clinical significance 

Homozygous or compound heterozygous defects in this gene are the cause of autosomal recessive Pelizaeus-Merzbacher-like disease-1.

Heterozygous missense mutations in this same gene cause pubertal onset hereditary lymphedema.

References

Further reading

Integral membrane proteins

Connexins